Richard Vincent Macaraeg  (September 27, 1952 – September 6, 1998) was an American-born Filipino singer recording artist, singer-songwriter, actor, teacher, journalist and historian, who became popular in the Philippines.

Early life
Ric Segreto was born in Brooklyn, New York City to Bridget Segreto, an Italian-American and Godofredo G. Macaraeg, a Filipino. Ric, the second son of five brothers and one sister was raised for the first five years of his life in New York by his mother, a dietician at a New York hospital and his father, an abdominal surgeon.

Ric's father, born in Malasiqui, Pangasinan, educated at the University of Santo Tomas in Manila, was a medic with the rank of captain in the Philippine Army during World War II. He was captured by Japanese soldiers and made to march in the Bataan Death March and was imprisoned on Corregidor Island. After the War, Dr. Macaraeg traveled to the United States and attended Johns Hopkins University. Dr. Macaraeg was the first Filipino diplomate to the F.A.C.S.

Both Ric's parents' love for music influenced his interest in music and singing. The family moved to the Philippines in 1957, where his father set up a physician's practice. Ric went to Lourdes School of Quezon City. In 1959, the family relocated to Guam, where growing up in a milder environment furthered Ric's interest in the performing arts. Ric played in a rock band with his elder brother Gordon, ages 12 and 13, and with grandsons of Filipino composer Nicanor Abelardo. Ric's band, The Asteroids, played in bars patronized by military personnel.

Ric was later sent back to the Philippines to attend high school at the Ateneo de Manila. While there, he became friends with Lito de Joya, Sonny Santiago, Gus Cosio, Renato Garcia, Chito Kintanar, Kenny Barton, Bruce Brown, Butch Dans, Kinjo Sawada, Goff Macaraeg, Doden Besa, Jim Paredes, and Boboy Garovillo, that became the original APO Hiking Society. After a year at the Ateneo, Ric returned to Guam. He then formed another band that included his brother Goff, Victor James, Dean Sampaio, and Joe Guererro, called the Salvation Army, singing and playing all over the island during weekends until he completed his high school.  Going to college made Ric look to the States and choosing Creighton University in Omaha, Nebraska, where he majored in history. During his college years, Ric played in bar bands for military service men in Bellevue, Nebraska (home to Offutt Air Force Base) and acted in college plays.

Early career
After graduation in 1974 at the age of 22, he toured the US with a show band, singing and playing bass guitar at Mountain Shadows in Scottsdale, Arizona, Harvey's in Reno and clubs in Las Vegas, Nevada. Meeting up with another show band bound for Japan out of San Diego, California, Ric played for Japanese audiences during the early 80's.

Later career
Yearning to reconnect with his Filipino roots, Ric left Japan and went to the Philippines. He played in a few clubs singing until he was discovered by the VICOR record company. His first hit, "Kahit Konting Pagtingin" in 1982, was an immediate favorite and launched his career as a Filipino recording artist. Performing many television shows and concerts local and overseas.

Teaching and journalism
A lover of history and education Ric's fondness for the written word led him to take a break from performing and dedicate some of his passion to teaching and writing. Touching base with his other home, Ric became a teacher in Guam and endeavored to enlighten high school students with his flair for history. He submitted sociology articles to a local Philippine magazine, MAN Magazine, after returning to the Philippines to record another album. Ric was also working on a thesis that addressed the Philippine music industry.

While teaching in Guam, Ric supplemented his free time performing in local beach bars and night clubs with his younger brother Gordon. Ric's sibling expressed some consternation at Ric's reluctance to practice and the latter's overt willingness to play songs they had never played before; perhaps Ric's way to sharpen his brother Gordon's musical abilities, but caused many embarrassing moments. Ric was also known for having Gordon start a set and then even before the first verse was started Ric would say, "I'll be right back".  Well into the song Gordon would find Ric sitting at the bar enjoying a beer and happily waving at him from the audience.  The band Ric and Gordon started was called the Bunelos Brothers, (name provided by Gordon). Ric, being the assumed professional he was, thought that name was perfect for their little music project (not too serious but enough to provoke controversy). The Bunelos Brothers were a regular feature at Tahiti Rama, Barney's Beach House and The Signature Pub. Their repertoire consisted mainly of Beatles music, easy listing tunes, MOR, and ballads. Their voices were homogenous and harmonies came very easily for them. Just like brothers all over the globe, not every decision was 100% mutual. There were fights on stage but most of them were mainly scowling looks and failures to sing back up. In some cases Gordon would get even with Ric and refuse to play. Ric would give his brother the "I'm going to kill you look" but Gordon knew his bark was worse than his bite. The Bunelos Brothers played together for 3 years going through an assortment of other members, including their eldest brother Goff.

Death
On September 6, 1998, at around 12:15 P.M., on a Sunday, Ric was riding his motorcycle from his home in Makati. He was killed in an accident over the then-under-construction Makati–Buendia Flyover bridgeway, when he either ran into or was hit by a steel bar. He died two days after his fellow singer, Willy Garte, who also died in an accident after being run over by a truck. He was 3 weeks short of his 46th birthday. 

He was survived by his wife Erica and their son Darby Macaraeg.

He was buried in San Ildefonso Catholic Cemetery in 
Malasiqui, Pangasinan.

Discography
At the time Ric's career took off the trend in the Philippines had shifted back to English original Filipino songs. He collaborated with Levi Celerio, Odette Quesada, Bodjie Dasig, Gerry Paraiso and Amado Trivino.

Ric's recorded two original albums, namely Segreto, followed by Man of the Hour. Since then there have been several compilation albums.

These are the many songs he released during his career that continue to be enjoyed by many of his fans and listeners.

1. Kahit Konting Pagtingin
2. Don't Know What To Say (Don't Know What To Do)
3. Give Me A Chance
4. Touched by the Rainbow
5. Angela
6. Come Back To Me
7. Do Ya, Do Ya Ever, Do Ya?
8. Man of the Hour
9. Hold On To My Love
10. All I Wanna Do
11. Slippin' Away
12. Even Just Once More
13. Stay
14. I Need You
15. I Thought She Was You
16. Since You Said Goodbye
17. Nang Dahil Sa Iyo
18. Labis Din Kaya?
19. Dasal
20. Loving You

 Ric can also be heard doing back-up vocals for the band RP (Rock Project) for Bob Aves & Goff Macaraeg
for the song Run

Filmography
May Minamahal (1993) as Himself / Performer of "Don't Know What To Do (Don't Know What To Say)" a.k.a. "Hopeless Romantic"
Nine Deaths of the Ninja (1985) as PC Trooper
Missing in Action (1984) as GI

Notes

References

External links

1952 births
1998 deaths
Musicians from Brooklyn
20th-century Filipino male singers
Manila sound musicians
American emigrants to the Philippines
American musicians of Filipino descent
Road incident deaths in the Philippines
APO Hiking Society members
20th-century Filipino male actors
Filipino people of Italian descent
Vicor Music artists